Viettea is a genus of moths belonging to the subfamily Tortricinae of the family Tortricidae. It contains only one species, Viettea spectabilis, which is found on Madagascar.

See also
List of Tortricidae genera

References

External links
Tortricid.net

Archipini
Monotypic moth genera
Moths described in 1960
Moths of Madagascar
Tortricidae genera